Mark Jerrold Henry (born June 12, 1971) is an American former powerlifter, Olympic weightlifter, strongman, and professional wrestler currently signed to All Elite Wrestling (AEW) as a commentator/analyst, coach, and talent scout. He is best known for his 25-year career in WWE.

He is was a two-time WWE world champion, a two-time Olympian (1992 and 1996) and a gold, silver, and bronze medalist at the Pan American Games in 1995. As a powerlifter, he was WDFPF World Champion (1995) and a two-time U.S. National Champion (1995 and 1997) as well as an all-time raw world record holder in the squat and deadlift. Currently, he still holds the WDFPF world records in the squat, deadlift and total and the USAPL American record in the deadlift since 1995. He is credited for the biggest raw squat and raw powerlifting total ever performed by a drug tested athlete, regardless of weight class, as well as the greatest raw deadlift by an American citizen.

In weightlifting, Henry was a three-time U.S. National Weightlifting Champion (1993, 1994, 1996), an American Open winner (1992), a two-time U.S. Olympic Festival Champion (1993 and 1994) and a NACAC champion (1996). He holds all three Senior US American weightlifting records of 1993–1997. In 2002 he won the first annual Arnold Strongman Classic.

Since joining the World Wrestling Federation (now WWE) in 1996, he became a one-time WWF European Champion and a two-time world champion, having held the ECW Championship in 2008, and WWE's World Heavyweight Championship in 2011. First winning the ECW Championship, he became only the fourth African-American world champion in WWE history (after The Rock, Booker T, and Bobby Lashley).

In April 2018, Henry was inducted into the WWE Hall of Fame Class of 2018.

Early life
Henry was born in the small town of Silsbee in East Texas, 90 miles northeast of Houston. As a child, he was a big wrestling fan and André the Giant was his favorite wrestler. While attending a wrestling show in Beaumont, Texas, young Henry tried to touch André as he was walking down the aisle, but tripped over the barricade. André picked him up out of the crowd and put him back behind the barricade. When Henry was 12 years old, his father, Ernest, died of complications from diabetes. When he was 14 years old, Henry was diagnosed with dyslexia.

Henry played football in high school until his senior year, when he strained ligaments in his wrist during the first game of the year and scored below 700 on the SAT.

Powerlifting career

His mother bought a set of weights for him when he was ten years old. During Henry's freshman year at Silsbee High School, he was already able to squat , which was well over school record. As an 18-year-old high school senior, Henry was called "the world's strongest teenager" by the Los Angeles Times, and made it into the headlines in early 1990 for winning the National High School Powerlifting Championships and setting teenage lifting world records in the squat  and total .

At the Texas High School Powerlifting Championships in April 1990, Terry Todd, a professor of kinesiology at the University of Texas at Austin and former weightlifter, spotted Henry and persuaded him to go to Austin after he graduated to train in the Olympic style of weightlifting. In July 1990 at the USPF Senior National Powerlifting Championships, 19-year-old Henry came second only to the legendary six-time World Powerlifting Champion Kirk Karwoski. While powerlifting relies primarily on brute strength and power, which Henry obviously possessed, Olympic weightlifting is considered more sophisticated, involving more agility, timing, flexibility and technique. There have been few lifters in history who have been able to be successful in both lifting disciplines. Mastering the technique of weightlifting usually takes many years of practice, but Henry broke four national junior records in weightlifting after only eight months of training. In April 1991, he won the United States National Junior Championships; 20 days later he placed fourth at the U.S. Senior National Championships, and finished sixth at the Junior World Weightlifting Championships in Germany two months later. Only few weeks afterwards, he became 1991's International Junior Champion in Powerlifiting as well. In Henry's first year in competitive weightlifting, he broke all three junior (20 and under) American records 12 times, and became the United States' top Superheavyweight, surpassing Mario Martinez.

At the age of 19, Henry had already managed to qualify for the weightlifting competition at the 1992 Summer Olympics, where he finished tenth in the Super- Heavyweight class. Ten months before the 1992 Olympics, Henry had begun training with Dragomir Cioroslan, a bronze medalist at the 1984 Summer Olympics, who said that he had "never seen anyone with Mark's raw talent". After the Olympics, Henry became more determined to focus on weightlifting and began competing all over the world. In late 1992 he took the win at the USA Weightlifting American Open and further proved his dominance on the American soil by winning not only the U.S. National Weightlifting Championships, but also the U.S. Olympic Festival Championships in 1993 and 1994. At the 1995 Pan American Games Henry won a gold, silver and bronze medal.

Having reached the pinnacle of weightlifting on a National and continental level, he competed again in powerlifting and shocked the world by winning the ADFPA U.S. National Powerlifting Championships in 1995 with a  raw Powerlifting Total. Later that same year in October, he competed in the drug-free Powerlifting World Championships and won again, even though he trained on the powerlifts only sparingly—due his main focus still being on the two Olympic lifts.

In 1996 Henry became the North America, Central America, Caribbean Islands (NACAC) Champion. He earned the right to compete at the Olympics by winning the U.S. National Weightlifting Championships in the Spring of 1996 for a third time. This  total, in the opinion of many experts in track field of international lifting—including Dragomir Cioroslan, the '96s coach of the U.S. team—was the highest ever made by an athlete who had never used anabolic steroids—who was lifetime drugfree. By that time, at the age of 24, Henry was generally acknowledged as the strongest man in the world, even by many of the Eastern Bloc athletes who outrank him in weightlifting. No one in the history of the sports had ever lifted as much as him in the five competitive lifts—the snatch and the clean and jerk in weightlifting—the squat, bench press and deadlift in powerlifting. To this day, his five lift total is still the greatest in history by a fair amount—making him arguably one of the strongest men that ever lived and stamp him, according to lifting statistician Herb Glossbrenner, as history's greatest lifter.

In the months prior to the 1996 Summer Olympics in Atlanta, Georgia, Henry received more attention and publicity than any lifter in recent United States history. He guested at Jay Leno, Conan O'Brien and The Oprah Winfrey Show and was featured on HBO Inside Sports and The Today Show. He was also featured in dozens of magazines including U.S. News & World Report, People Vanity Fair, ESPN The Magazine and Life where he was photographed nude by famed artist Annie Lebowitz. During this period he connected with WWE owner Vince McMahon for the first time, which led to him signing a 10-year deal as professional wrestler.

Henry at 6-foot-4-inches tall and  bodyweight, became the largest athlete in Olympic history and was voted captain of the Olympic weightlifting team. Unfortunately, he suffered a back injury during the competition and was unable to approach his normal performance level. Due to the injury he had to drop out after his first clean and jerk attempt and finished with a disappointing 14th place. His appearance at the Olympics proved to be his last official competition in Olympic weightlifting, as he retired from weightlifting, vowing never to return unless the sport is "cleaned up" of anabolic steroid use.

Since his career start as a professional wrestler shortly after the Olympics, he broke his leg in the fall of 1996. But by the summer of the following year he had rehabilitated it enough to be able to compete at the USAPL National Powerlifting Championships 1997, where he won the competition to become the U.S National Powerlifting Champion in the Super Heavyweight class again. He had planned to continue heavy training in powerlifting, although his travel schedule as a professional wrestler with the WWF (now WWE) has made sustained training difficult. Mark's WWF contract was unique in many ways, allowing him at least three months off each year from wrestling, so he can train for the national and world championships in weightlifting or powerlifting. Barring injury, Mark had originally hoped to return to the platform in late 1998, to lift for many more years, and to eventually squat at least  without a “squat suit” and to deadlift .

By basically ending his lifting career at the age of 26, it is probable that he never reached his full physical potential as a professional lifter. Henry remains the youngest man in history to squat more than 900 pounds without a squat suit as well as the youngest to total more than 2,300 pounds raw – he's the only person ever to have accomplished any of these feats at under 25 years of age.

Personal powerlifting records
Powerlifting Competition Records
done in official Powerlifting full meets
 Squat –  raw with knee wraps (done on October 29, 1995 WDFPF)
→ former all-time unequipped squat world record for over a decade in SHW class until 2010 (+regardless of weight class until 2007)

→ current WDFPF world record squat in SHW class (+regardless of weight class and equipment) since 1995

→ current drug tested all-time world record squat without a suit in SHW class (+regardless of weight class) since 1995

→ currently heaviest walked-out raw squat of all time (without a monolift) regardless of weight class or federation since 1995
 Deadlift –  raw (done on July 16, 1995, ADFPA (USAPL))
→ former all-time raw world record deadlift in SHW class until 2010 (+regardless of weight class until 2009)

→ current all-time highest raw deadlift ever pulled by an American in SHW class (+regardless of weight class) since 1995
→ current Open Men American record deadlift in SHW class (+regardless of weight class and equipment) since 1995

→ current all-time US national championship record deadlift in SHW class (+regardless of weight class and equipment) since 1995

→ current USAPL American record deadlift in SHW class (+regardless of weight class and equipment) since 1995

→ current drug tested raw world record deadlift (in SHW class only) since 1995
 Powerlifting Total –  ( /  raw with wraps (done on October 29, 1995 WDFPF)
→ current WDFPF world record in SHW class (+regardless of weight class and equipment) since 1995

→ current drug tested all-time world record unequipped powerlifting total in SHW class (+regardless of weight class)

Career aggregate Powerlifting Total (best official lifts) – 

Powerlifting Gym Records (unofficial)
 Squat – 
 Bench press – 
 Deadlift – 

Career aggregate Powerlifting Total (best unofficial lifts) – 

 Front Squat – 
 Behind-the-neck-press – over 

Weightlifting Competition Records
done in official competition

 Snatch:  (done at 1996's U.S. Nationals)
→ Senior US American snatch record 1993–1997 in SHW class (+regardless of weight class)
 Clean and jerk:  (done at 1996's U.S. Nationals)
→ Senior US American clean&jerk record 1993–1997 in SHW class
 Weightlifting Total:  – snatch:  / clean&jerk:  (done at 1996's U.S. Nationals)
→ Senior US American weightlifting total record 1993–1997 in SHW class (+regardless of weight class)

Weightlifting Gym Records (unofficial)
all three done in training after the 1996's U.S. Nationals, but prior to the Olympics '96

 Snatch: 
 Clean&jerk: 
 Weightlifting Total:

Combined lifting records
 official weightlifting total + official powerlifting total = Combined Supertotal:
 +  =  raw with wraps
→ current all-time highest combined weightlifting/powerlifting total in history (since 1996*)

 5 official weightlifting & powerlifting lifts combined – the snatch + the clean-and-jerk and the squat + bench press + deadlift = Five-Lift-Combined-Total:
  +  +  +  +  = 
→ current all-time highest 5 lift total in history (since 1996*)

* both combined all-time records had previously been held by legendary powerlifter Jon Cole

Holding these all-time records in the lifting sports makes Mark Henry arguably one of the strongest men in history. Having achieved this at the very young age of 24 while being lifetime drug-free makes it even more impressive. Many experts in the field, including Bill Kazmaier, Jan and Terry Todd, Dr. Robert M. Goldman, Arnold Schwarzenegger, Muscle & Fitness magazine and Flex magazine, consider him to be "one of the Strongest Men that ever lived" or even "the most naturally gifted strongman in history".

When asked in September 2003, who the strongest man in the world is today [2003], Bill Kazmaier, considered by many to be the greatest strongman of all time, stated: "It would have to be Mark Henry. [...] I think he's one of the strongest men in the history of the world, without a doubt."

Professional wrestling career

World Wrestling Federation/Entertainment/WWE

Early career (1996–1997)
At the age of 24, Henry made his first appearance on World Wrestling Federation (WWF) programming on the March 11, 1996 episode of Monday Night Raw, where he press slammed Jerry Lawler, who was ridiculing Henry while interviewing him in the ring. After Henry competed in the 1996 Summer Olympics, the WWF signed him to a ten-year contract. Trained by professional wrestler Leo Burke, his first feud in the WWF was with Lawler. At the pay-per-view event, SummerSlam in August 1996, Henry came to the aid of Jake Roberts who was suffering indignity at the hands of Lawler. His debut wrestling match was at In Your House: Mind Games on September 22, 1996, where he defeated Lawler. The feud continued on the live circuit during subsequent weeks. On the November 4 episode of Raw, Henry served as a cornerman for Barry Windham in a match against Goldust. He was set to team with Windham, Marc Mero and Rocky Maivia to take on the team of Lawler, Goldust, Hunter Hearst Helmsley and Crush at Survivor Series, but was replaced by Jake Roberts when he was forced to withdraw from the event due to injury. On the November 17 episode of Superstars, Henry defeated Hunter Hearst Helmsley, Crush and Goldust in a tug of war contest. HHenry also worked a couple of shows for United States Wrestling Association. Henry's career was then stalled as, over the next year, he took time off to heal injuries and engage in further training. 

In November 1997, he returned to the ring, making his televised return the following month. By the end of the year, he was a regular fixture on WWF programming, defeating The Brooklyn Brawler on the December 15 episode of Raw, and beating The Sultan on the December 27 episode of Shotgun.

Nation of Domination and Sexual Chocolate (1998–2000) 

Henry joined the faction with Farooq, The Rock, Kama Mustafa, and D'Lo Brown on January 12, 1998. After The Rock usurped Farooq's position as leader, Henry switched loyalties to The Rock. He also competed at WrestleMania XIV in a tag team Battle Royal with Brown as his partner, but they did not win. After short feuds against Ken Shamrock and Vader, Henry participated in his faction's enmity against D-Generation X, which included a romantic storyline with DX member Chyna. When The Nation disbanded, he engaged in a short feud with The Rock, defeating him at Judgment Day: In Your House with help from Brown, and then forming a permanent team with Brown, gaining Ivory as a manager.

During the next year, Henry gave himself the nickname "Sexual Chocolate", adopting a ladies' man character. He first resumed his storyline with former enemy Chyna, but it ended with her betraying him in a controversial angle including a transvestite. During a match at the August 1999 SummerSlam pay-per-view between Brown and Jeff Jarrett for the WWF Intercontinental and WWF European Championships (both held at the time by Brown), Henry turned on Brown and helped Jarrett win the match and the titles. The next night, Henry was awarded the European title by Jarrett in return for his help. Henry lost the title one month later to Brown at the Unforgiven pay-per-view.

The night after he tried to make up with Brown and later in the week claimed to be a sex addict resulting in him attending a sex therapy session a week later where he claimed that he lost his virginity at eight years old to his sister, and had just slept with her two days ago. He was part of a storyline about him overcoming sex addiction, which he accomplished thanks to The Godfather.

After this twist, Henry turned into a fan favorite, and was seen on television romancing WWF veteran wrestler Mae Young as part of the "Sexual Chocolate" character. He feuded with Viscera during this time, as part of a storyline where Viscera splashed Mae Young while she was carrying Henry's child. Young later gave birth to a hand.

Ohio Valley Wrestling and strongman competitions (2000–2002)
In 2000, Henry was sent to Ohio Valley Wrestling (OVW) to improve his conditioning and wrestling skills. In OVW, he teamed with Nick Dinsmore to compete in a tournament for the OVW Southern Tag Team Championship in mid-2001. He also worked a couple of matches for Heartland Wrestling Association. Later that year, Henry's mother died, causing him to go on hiatus from wrestling. He felt he had to compete in the "Super Bowl of weight lifting"—the Arnold Strongman Classic—in honor of his mother, who gave him his first weight set when he was a child.

Four months prior to the contest, Henry began lifting the heaviest of weights and trained for the first time since 1997 for a major lifting competition. He had never been a professional strongman before, but in the coming contest he was to face the very best of the best of professional strongmen, such as the #1 ranked strongman in the world, and defending World's Strongest Man competition winner of 2001 Svend Karlsen, World's Strongest Man winner of 2006 Phil Pfister, World Powerlifting Champion of 2001 and equipped deadlift world record holder Andy Bolton, World Muscle Power Champion, Olympic weightlifting Champion Raimonds Bergmanis, and reigning America's Strongest Man of 2001 Brian Schoonveld.

On February 22, 2002, in Columbus, Ohio the competition, consisting of four events, designed to determine the lifter with the greatest overall body power, began. Henry surprised everybody when he won the first event, setting a world record in the process by lifting the Apollon's Axle three times overhead. Only three men in history had ever been able to press it at all.

Since Henry had only trained for four months and defeated the crème-de-là-crème of worldwide strongmen, who had been practicing for years, his win was a shock for strongman experts worldwide, but remained basically unnoticed by the wrestling audience. Henry proved to be worthy of the title "World's Strongest Man" not only by winning the contest, but also by achieving it in record time. By doing so he was again seen as the legit "strongest man in the world" by many lifting experts for a second time since 1996.

Various feuds (2002–2007)
Henry returned to the WWE in April 2002 and was sent to the SmackDown! brand, where he developed an in-ring persona of performing "tests of strength" while other wrestlers took bets on the tests, but the gimmick met with little success. During this time he competed against such superstars as Chris Jericho and Christian. After being used sporadically on WWE (formerly WWF) television during 2002, as he was training for a weightlifting contest, and suffering a knee injury, Henry was sent back to OVW for more training.

In August 2003, Henry returned to WWE television on the Raw roster as a heel where he found some success as a member of "Thuggin' And Buggin' Enterprises", a group of African Americans led by Theodore Long who worked a race angle in which they felt they were victims of racism and were being held down by the "white man". During that time, Henry was involved in a brief program with World Heavyweight Champion Goldberg when former champion, Triple H, put a bounty on Goldberg. This was followed by a brief rivalry with Shawn Michaels, before he engaged in a rivalry with Booker T. After defeating Booker T twice, once in a street fight and once in a six-man tag team match, he lost to Booker T at the Armageddon pay-per-view in December 2003. At a practice session in OVW in February 2004, Henry tore his quadriceps muscle, and was out for over a year after undergoing surgery. Henry was then utilized by WWE as a public relations figure during his recovery, before returning to OVW to finish out 2005.

During the December 30 episode of SmackDown!, Henry made his return to television, as he interfered in a WWE Tag Team Championship match, joining with MNM (Joey Mercury, Johnny Nitro, and Melina), to help them defeat Rey Mysterio and Batista for the championship. A week later on SmackDown!, Henry got in a confrontation with the World Heavyweight Champion, Batista, and went on to interfere in a steel cage match between MNM and the team of Mysterio and Batista, helping MNM to retain their titles. Henry then had another match with Batista at a live event where Batista received a severely torn triceps that required surgery, forcing him to vacate his title. On the January 10, 2006 episode of SmackDown!, Henry was involved in a Battle Royal for the vacant World Heavyweight Championship. He was finally eliminated by Kurt Angle, who won the title.

A week later, Henry received assistance from Daivari, who turned on Angle and announced that he was the manager of Henry. With Daivari at his side, Henry faced Angle for the World Heavyweight Championship at the 2006 Royal Rumble in January, losing when Angle hit him with a chair (without the referee seeing) and pinned him with a roll-up.

On the March 3 episode of SmackDown!, Henry interfered in a World Heavyweight Championship match between Angle and The Undertaker, attacking the latter when he was seconds from possibly winning the title. Henry then performed a diving splash on Undertaker, driving him through the announcer's table. Henry was then challenged to a casket match by Undertaker at WrestleMania 22. Henry vowed to defeat The Undertaker and end his undefeated streak at WrestleMania, but The Undertaker defeated him. Henry had a rematch against The Undertaker on the April 7 episode of SmackDown!. It ended in a no-contest when Daivari introduced his debuting client, The Great Khali. Khali went to the ring and attacked The Undertaker, starting a new feud and ending Henry's.

During the rest of April and May, Henry gained a pinfall victory over the World Heavyweight Champion, Rey Mysterio in a non-title match. Henry entered the King of the Ring Tournament, and lost to Bobby Lashley in the first round. He later cost Kurt Angle his World Heavyweight Championship opportunity against Mysterio, when he jumped off the top rope and crushed Angle through a table. Henry was then challenged by Angle to face off at Judgment Day, Henry then sent a "message" to Angle by defeating Paul Burchill. At Judgment Day, Henry defeated Angle by countout. Although winning, Angle got his revenge after the match by hitting Henry with a chair and putting him through a table.

Henry later went on what was referred to as a "path of destruction", causing injuries to numerous superstars. Henry "took out" Chris Benoit and Paul Burchill on this path of destruction, and attacked Rey Mysterio and Chavo Guerrero Jr. These events led up to a feud with the returning Batista, whom Henry had put out of action with a legitimate injury several months beforehand. When Batista returned he and Henry were scheduled to face one another at The Great American Bash in July. Weeks before that event, however, on the July 15, 2006 Saturday Night's Main Event XXXIII, Henry was involved in a six-man tag team match with King Booker and Finlay against Batista, Rey Mysterio, and Bobby Lashley. During the match, Henry was injured, canceling the scheduled match at The Great American Bash, as Henry needed surgery. Doctors later found that Henry completely tore his patella tendon off the bone and split his patella completely in two.

Henry returned on the May 11, 2007 episode of SmackDown!, after weeks of vignettes hyping his return. He attacked The Undertaker after a World Heavyweight Championship steel cage match with Batista, allowing Edge to take advantage of the situation and use his Money in the Bank contract. Henry then began a short feud with Kane, defeating him in a Lumberjack Match at One Night Stand. Shortly after, Henry made an open challenge to the SmackDown! locker room, which nobody ever accepted. In the coming weeks he faced various jobbers—wrestlers who consistently lose to make their opponents look stronger—and quickly defeated them all. On the August 3 episode of SmackDown!, he claimed that nobody accepted the open challenge to step into the ring with him because of what he had done to The Undertaker, presenting footage of his assault on The Undertaker. The Undertaker responded over the following weeks, playing various mind games with Henry. Henry finally faced The Undertaker again at Unforgiven in September, losing to him after being given a Last Ride. Two weeks later, Henry lost a rematch to The Undertaker after The Undertaker performed a chokeslam on Henry.

ECW Champion (2007–2009)
After a short hiatus, Henry returned to WWE programming on the October 23 episode of ECW, attacking Kane, along with The Great Khali and Big Daddy V. Henry then began teaming with Big Daddy V against Kane and CM Punk, and was briefly managed by Big Daddy V's manager, Matt Striker. At Armageddon, Henry and Big Daddy V defeated Kane and Punk. Before WrestleMania XXIV aired, Henry participated in a 24-man battle royal to determine the number one contender for the ECW Championship, but failed to win.

As part of the 2008 WWE Supplemental Draft, Henry was drafted to the ECW brand. At Night of Champions, Henry defeated Kane and Big Show in a triple threat match to capture the ECW Championship in his debut match as an ECW superstar. This was his first world championship in WWE, which also made him the fourth African-American world champion in WWE history. Upon winning the title, it was made exclusive to the ECW brand once again. Henry's title win came nearly a full decade after he was awarded the European Championship, which was back in 1999 and the only title he held in WWE. A few weeks later, Hall of Famer Tony Atlas returned to WWE to act as Henry's manager. Shortly after, ECW General Manager, Theodore Long, unveiled a new, entirely platinum ECW Championship belt design. In August, Henry defended the title against Matt Hardy at SummerSlam after getting himself disqualified; however championships cannot change hands via disqualification, meaning that Henry retained the title. Henry later lost the title to Hardy at September's Unforgiven in the Championship Scramble match.

Henry attempted to regain the championship throughout the end of 2008, and had a match against Hardy at No Mercy, but failed as he was unsuccessful. Henry and Atlas then engaged in a scripted rivalry against Finlay and Hornswoggle, which included Henry losing a Belfast Brawl to Finlay at Armageddon. At the start of 2009, Henry qualified for the Money in the Bank ladder match at WrestleMania 25, and was involved in a series of matches with the other competitors on Raw, SmackDown, and ECW. He was unsuccessful at WrestleMania, however, as CM Punk won the match. In May, Henry began a rivalry with Evan Bourne, which began after Bourne defeated Henry by countout on the May 26 episode of ECW.

Tag team championship pursuits (2009–2011)

On June 29, Henry was traded to the Raw brand and redebuted for the brand that night as the third opponent in a three-on-one gauntlet match against WWE Champion Randy Orton, which he won, turning Henry into a face in the process. In August 2009, Henry formed a tag team with Montel Vontavious Porter and the two challenged the Unified WWE Tag Team Champions Jeri-Show (Chris Jericho and The Big Show) for the title at Breaking Point, but were unsuccessful. They stopped teaming afterwards, becoming involved in separate storylines, until the February 15, 2010 episode of Raw in which they defeated the Unified WWE Tag Team Champions The Big Show and The Miz in a non-title match. The next week they challenged The Big Show and The Miz in a title match but were unsuccessful. At Extreme Rules, Henry and MVP fought for a chance to become number one contenders to the Unified WWE Tag Team Championship, but were the second team eliminated in a gauntlet match by The Big Show and The Miz. Ultimately, The Hart Dynasty (Tyson Kidd and David Hart Smith) won the match.

Henry mentored Lucky Cannon in the second season of NXT. Cannon was eliminated on the August 10 episode of NXT. In September, Henry began teaming with Evan Bourne, starting at the Night of Champions pay-per-view, where they entered a Tag Team Turmoil for the WWE Tag Team Championship. They made it to the final two before being defeated by Cody Rhodes and Drew McIntyre. The team came to an end in October when Bourne suffered an injury and was taken out of action. Henry then formed a team with Yoshi Tatsu on the November 29 episode of Raw, defeating WWE Tag Team Champions Justin Gabriel and Heath Slater, after a distraction by John Cena. They received a shot at the championship the next week, in a fatal four-way elimination tag team match, which also included The Usos and Santino Marella and Vladimir Kozlov. Henry and Tatsu were the first team eliminated in the match.

World Heavyweight Champion (2011–2012) 
On the April 25, 2011 episode of Raw, Henry was drafted to the SmackDown brand as part of the 2011 WWE draft. In the main event of the night, Henry attacked his teammates John Cena and Christian, turning heel in the process. On the May 27 episode of SmackDown, Henry participated in a Triple Threat match against Sheamus and Christian to decide the number one contender to the World Heavyweight Championship, which was won by Sheamus. On the June 17 episode of SmackDown, Henry was scheduled to face an angry and emotionally unstable Big Show, who warned Henry not to get into the ring; Henry ignored the warning and Big Show assaulted him before the match could begin. This act ignited a feud between the two; Henry attacked Big Show both backstage and during matches while on the July 1 episode of SmackDown, Big Show's music played during Henry's match against Randy Orton, causing Henry to be counted out and costing him a shot at the World Heavyweight Championship. Henry reacted by destroying the audio equipment and attacking a technician. Henry faced Big Show in a singles match at Money in the Bank and won. After the match, Henry crushed Big Show's leg with a chair, (kayfabe) injuring him, an act Henry later referenced as an induction into the "Hall of Pain". Henry did the same to Kane on the next episode of SmackDown, and in the months ahead, Vladimir Kozlov and The Great Khali suffered the same fate.

On the July 29 episode of SmackDown, Henry was informed that he could no longer compete as no one dared to fight him, but Sheamus interrupted, saying that he wasn't afraid of Henry before slapping him. At SummerSlam, Henry defeated Sheamus by count-out after slamming him through a ring barricade. On the August 19 episode of SmackDown, Henry won a 20-man Battle Royal to become the number one contender for the World Heavyweight Championship to face Randy Orton at Night of Champions, and throughout weeks on SmackDown and Raw, Henry regularly attacked Orton, getting an advantage over him. At Night of Champions, Henry defeated Orton to win the World Heavyweight Championship for the first time. Henry successfully defended the title against Orton at Hell in a Cell in a Hell in a Cell match.

On the October 7 episode of SmackDown, Big Show returned and chokeslammed Henry through the announce table, thus earning a title shot against Henry at Vengeance. During the match, Henry superplexed Big Show from the top rope, causing the ring to collapse from the impact and the match to be ruled a no contest. Henry began a feud with the Money in the Bank briefcase holder Daniel Bryan on the November 4 episode of SmackDown, challenging Bryan to a non-title match to prove that Bryan could not become champion. During the match, Big Show knocked out Henry, making him win by disqualification. Big Show then urged Bryan to cash in his contract, but Henry recovered and attacked both Bryan and Big Show before the match could start. At Survivor Series, Henry retained the World Heavyweight Championship against Big Show after a low blow that disqualified Henry. Angered by Henry's cowardice, Big Show crushed Henry's ankle with a steel chair. On the November 25 episode of SmackDown, Henry was knocked out again by Big Show, at which point Bryan cashed in his briefcase for a title match and quickly pinned Henry. However, SmackDown General Manager Theodore Long revealed that Henry was not medically cleared to compete and voided the match, so Henry remained champion and the briefcase was returned to Bryan. Later that night, Bryan won a fatal-four-way match to face Henry for the World Heavyweight Championship in a steel cage. On the November 29 episode of SmackDown, Henry defeated Bryan in a steel cage match to retain the World Heavyweight Championship.

Then at TLC: Tables, Ladders & Chairs, Henry lost the World Heavyweight Championship to Big Show in a chairs match. After the match, Henry knocked Big Show out, resulting in Daniel Bryan cashing in his Money in the Bank contract to win his first World Heavyweight Championship. On the January 20 episode of SmackDown, Bryan retained the championship against Henry in a lumberjack match after Bryan provoked the lumberjacks to come in and attack them to cause a no contest. At the 2012 Royal Rumble event, Henry faced Bryan and Big Show in a triple threat steel cage match for the World Heavyweight Championship; Bryan escaped the cage to retain the title. On the February 3 episode of SmackDown, Henry was suspended indefinitely (in storyline) by SmackDown General Manager Theodore Long, after Henry physically accosted Long as he demanded a one-on-one rematch that night with Bryan. In reality, Henry had hyper-extended his knee the previous week. Henry returned to in-ring action on the February 20 episode of Raw, losing to Sheamus. On the April 2 and 9 episodes of Raw, Henry faced CM Punk for the WWE Championship which he won by count-out and disqualification; as a result, Punk retained his title. On the April 16 episode of Raw, Punk defeated Henry in a no-disqualification, no count-out match to retain the WWE Championship. On May 14, Henry announced he was going under a career-threatening surgery for an injury.

Final feuds (2013–2017) 
After a nine-month absence, Henry made his return on the February 4, 2013 episode of Raw, brutally attacking Daniel Bryan, Rey Mysterio and Sin Cara. Four days later on SmackDown, Henry defeated Randy Orton to earn a spot in the number one contenders' Elimination Chamber match for the World Heavyweight Championship at Elimination Chamber. At the pay-per-view on February 17, Henry eliminated Daniel Bryan and Kane before being eliminated by Randy Orton. After his elimination, Henry attacked the three remaining participants before being escorted out by WWE officials. Henry then began a feud with Ryback after several non-verbal confrontations. On the March 15 episode of SmackDown, Henry was defeated by Ryback via disqualification, following interference from The Shield. Afterward, Henry delivered the World's Strongest Slam to Ryback three times in a row. On April 7 at WrestleMania 29, Henry defeated Ryback in a singles match. Later that month, Henry reignited a feud with Sheamus by repeatedly attacking Sheamus backstage. Henry and Sheamus then challenged each other in tests of strength, but with Sheamus unable to best Henry, he resorted to attacking Henry with Brogue Kicks. After Sheamus (during his match) Brogue Kicked Henry (who was on commentary), Henry snapped and brutally whipped Sheamus with a belt. This led to a strap match on May 19 at Extreme Rules, where Sheamus emerged victorious. With the loss to Sheamus, Henry declared that he was "going home".

After being absent from television due to injuries, Henry used social media to tease his retirement. On the June 17 episode of Raw, Henry returned, interrupting WWE Champion John Cena and delivering an emotional retirement speech, which was revealed as a ruse when Henry gave Cena a World's Strongest Slam after concluding his speech. The segment was highly praised by fans and critics. With Henry stating his intent to challenge for the "only title he's never held", he was granted a WWE Championship match against Cena at Money in the Bank. On July 14 at the pay-per-view, Henry failed in his title challenge against Cena after submitting to the STF. The following night on Raw, Henry cut a promo to congratulate Cena on his win and asked for a rematch for SummerSlam, but was ultimately attacked by The Shield, turning face in the process for the first time since 2011. Henry continued his face turn the following week, by confronting The Shield and teaming together with The Usos to fend them off. Henry and the Usos went on to lose to The Shield in two six-man tag team matches, the first on the July 29 episode of Raw, and the second on the August 7 episode of Main Event. On the August 12 episode of Raw, Henry competed in a Battle Royal to determine the number one contender for the United States Championship, but was the last man eliminated by Rob Van Dam. After the match, Henry and Van Dam were confronted by The Shield, before the returning Big Show came to their aid. Four days later on SmackDown, Henry, Show, and Van Dam defeated The Shield in a six-man tag team match. After a suspected hamstring injury on August 31 at the TD Garden in Boston Massachusetts, Henry was cleared to compete.

Henry returned to in-ring action on November 24 at Survivor Series, answering Ryback's open challenge and defeating him. On the January 6, 2014 episode of Raw, Henry tried to confront Brock Lesnar during separate encounters after Lesnar's return, resulting in Henry receiving an F-5 the first time and then Lesnar injured Henry's arm after getting it in a kimura lock hold, causing Henry to wail in pain and be absent. He returned on February 10 episode of Raw, and answered Dean Ambrose's open challenge for the United States Championship, but was unable to win the title due to interference by the rest of The Shield. In March, Henry suffered another attack from Lesnar, this time resulting in Henry receiving an F-5 through the announcing table.

On the August 4 episode of Raw, Henry defeated Damien Sandow after a few months absence. That same week on SmackDown, Henry formed a tag team with Big Show to defeat RybAxel (Ryback and Curtis Axel). On the August 18 episode of Raw, Henry entered a feud with Rusev by attacking him. This set up a match between Henry and Rusev at Night of Champions, which he lost by submission. The following night on Raw, he lost to Rusev again by knockout via submission. On the October 27 episode of Raw, Henry attacked Big Show during their tag team match against Gold and Stardust, and turning heel in the process. On the November 3 episode of Raw, Henry lost to Big Show via disqualification and slammed Big Show onto the steel steps. On the November 10 Raw, he joined The Authority's team to face John Cena's team at Survivor Series. On November 23 at Survivor Series, Henry was the first to be eliminated from Team Authority 50 seconds into the match after being knocked out by Big Show. Henry then took another hiatus due to an unspecified injury.

Henry returned on the March 12, 2015 episode of SmackDown, confronting Roman Reigns for having a lack of identity and for not being respected, resulting in Reigns attacking Henry. The attack caused Henry to become a believer in Reigns, and turning face in the process. Henry was unsuccessful in the Elimination Chamber match for the vacant Intercontinental Championship at Elimination Chamber, replacing Rusev who was injured, but was eliminated by Sheamus At Royal Rumble pre-show on January 24, 2016, Henry teamed with Jack Swagger to win a Fatal 4-Way tag team match to earn their spots in the Royal Rumble match. Despite this victory, Henry entered the Rumble match at #22 and lasted only 47 seconds when he was quickly eliminated by The Wyatt Family. At WrestleMania 32, Henry entered his third André the Giant Memorial Battle Royal, where he made it to the final six competitors until being eliminated by Kane and Darren Young.

On July 19, at the 2016 WWE draft, Henry was drafted to Raw. On the August 1 episode of Raw, Henry claimed he still "had a lot left in him" when he spoke of reviving the Hall of Pain and his participation in the Olympics. Raw General Manager Mick Foley gave Henry a United States Championship match, but Henry would lose by submission to Rusev. In October, Henry allied himself with R-Truth and Goldust in a feud against Titus O'Neil and The Shining Stars (Primo and Epico), in which Henry's team came out victorious. Henry returned at the Royal Rumble on January 29, 2017, as entrant number 6, only to be eliminated by Braun Strowman. He unsuccessfully competed in the Andre the Giant Memorial Battle Royal at WrestleMania 33.

Retirement and WWE Hall of Famer (2017–2021) 
Following WrestleMania 33, Henry retired and transitioned into a backstage producers role. He later made his return in a backstage cameo at the Raw 25 Years event in January 2018. On March 19, 2018, it was announced that Henry would be inducted into the WWE Hall of Fame by Big Show, who was one of his closest friends in WWE. On April 27, at the Greatest Royal Rumble, Henry participated in the event's Royal Rumble match, scoring 3 eliminations, but was himself eliminated by Daniel Bryan and Dolph Ziggler. In early 2019, Henry took on a backstage mentoring role helping talent work on their off-air attitude, including cleanliness and respect in the locker room.

Henry appeared on the January 4, 2021 episode of Raw, on its Raw Legends Night special, where in he appeared riding on a scooter due to an injured leg. He was verbally confronted by Randy Orton in what was his final appearance in WWE.

All Elite Wrestling (2021–present)
Henry made his debut for All Elite Wrestling (AEW) on May 30, 2021, at Double or Nothing where it was announced that he will be a part of the commentary team for its new show AEW Rampage, as well as a coach.

Personal life
Henry has an older brother named Pat. He lives in Austin, Texas with his wife Jana, son Jacob, and daughter Joanna. He also has a two-foot ferret named Pipe. He drives a Hummer that he won in the 2002 Arnold Strongman Classic. On September 10, 2012, Henry served as one of the pallbearers for actor Michael Clarke Duncan's funeral.

In March 2019, Henry pledged to donate his brain to CTE research once he dies.

Filmography

Film

Video games
Henry appears in the following licensed wrestling video games:

Championships, records, and accomplishments

Powerlifting
 Championships Participation – High School Level
 Two times 1st place in Texas State High School Powerlifting TEAM Championships (in Division I under Silsbee High School)
 1st place in Texas State High School Powerlifting Championships 1988 in SHW division
 1st place in Texas State High School Powerlifting Championships 1989 in SHW division
 1st place in Texas State High School Powerlifting Championships 1990 in SHW division
 1st place in National High School Powerlifting Championships 1990 in SHW division at age 18
 results: Powerlifting Total –  (+
 Championships Participation – Junior&Senior Level
 1st place in International Junior (20–23) Powerlifting Championships 1991 in SHW division at age 20
 2nd place in Men's USPF Senior National Championships 1990 in SHW division at age 19
 results: Powerlifting Total –  (
 1st place in ADFPA (USAPL) National Powerlifting Championships 1995 in SHW division at age 24
 results: Powerlifting Total –  ( raw with wraps
 1st place in WDFPF World Powerlifting Championships 1995 in SHW division at age 24
 results: Powerlifting Total –  ( raw with wraps
 1st place in USAPL National Powerlifting Championships 1997 in SHW division at age 26
 results: Powerlifting Total –  ( raw with wraps
 Records*
 Teen III (18–19 years) Level
 Collegiate Level
 Junior Level (20–23 years)
 Senior Level (24+ years)
 Federation Records
 World Drug-Free Powerlifting Federation (WDFPF) World Records
 U.S.A. Powerlifting (USAPL) US American Records
 Special Powerlifting Honors
 "The World's Strongest Teen-ager" by the Los Angeles Times in April 1990.
 Mark Henry was voted in the All-time Top 25 All-Mens US Powerlifting Nationals Team in 2007.
 Mark Henry is the only human in history who has not only squatted more than  without a squat suit, but also deadlifted more than  raw.
 Mark Henry is the only human in history to have squatted more than  without a squat suit and deadlifted more than  raw in one and the same powerlifting meet.
 Mark Henry's  raw squat and  deadlift, done on July 16, 1995, is the highest raw "squat-pull-2-lift-total" (squat+deadlift=) ever lifted in a competition. (Andrei Malanichev's  squat and  deadlift =  on October 22, 2011, being the 2nd highest ever; Mark Henry's  squat and  deadlift =  being the 3rd highest, Benedikt Magnusson's  squat and  deadlift =  being the 4th highest; Malanichev's  squat and  deadlift =  being the 5th; Don Reinhoudt's  squat and  deadlift =  being th 6th)

* incomplete

** surpassed by Robert Wilkerson (SHW class) of the United States with a  raw squat with knee wraps on June 7, 2010, at the Southern Powerlifting Federation (SPF) Nationals (open competition, not drug-tested) as the all-time raw world record in the SHW class*** surpassed by Sergiy Karnaukhov (308-pound-class) of Ukraine] with a  raw squat with knee wraps on November 4, 2007 as the all-time raw "regardless of weight class" world record**** surpassed by Andy Bolton (SHW class) of the United Kingdom with a  raw deadlift on May 23, 2010 (open competition, not drug-tested) as the all-time raw world record in the SHW class (+regardless of weight class)***** surpassed by Konstantin Konstantinovs (308-pound-class) of Latvia] with a  raw deadlift without a belt on July 4, 2009 (drug-tested competition) as the all-time raw "regardless of weight class" world recordWeightlifting
 Olympic Games
 Olympic Games team member representing USA at the Olympics 1992 in Barcelona, Spain, finishing 10th place in SHW division at age 21
 Team Captain of the Olympic Weightlifting team representing USA at the Olympics 1996 in Atlanta, Georgia, finishing 14th in SHW division due to back injury at age 25
 Pan American Games
 Silver Medalist in the Olympic weightlifting Total in SHW (+108) division at the Pan American Games 1995 in Mar del Plata, Argentina at age 23
 result: total – 804 pounds
 Gold Medalist in the Snatch in SHW (+108) division at the Pan American Games 1995 in Mar del Plata, Argentina at age 23
 result: snatch – 391 1/4 pounds, setting an American record
 Bronze Medalist in Clean and jerk in SHW (+108) division at the Pan American Games 1995 in Mar del Plata, Argentina at age 23
 result: clean and jerk – snatch 412 3/4 pounds
 North America, Central America, Caribbean Islands (NACAC) Championships
 1st place in North America, Central America, Caribbean Islands Championships 1996 in SHW (+108 kg) division
 U.S. National Weightlifting Championships
 1st place in U.S. National Junior Weightlifting Championships 1991 in SHW (+110 kg) division at age 19
 results: total: 326.0 kg –  snatch: 156.0 kg / clean&jerk: 170.0 kg
 4th place in U.S. Senior National Weightlifting Championships 1991 in SHW (+110 kg) division at age 19
 results: total: 325.0 kg –  snatch: 150.0 kg / clean&jerk: 175.0 kg
 3rd place in U.S. Senior National Weightlifting Championships 1992 in SHW (+110 kg) division at age 20
 results: total: 365.0 kg  –  snatch: 165.0 kg / clean&jerk: 200.0 kg
 1st place in U.S. Senior National Weightlifting Championships 1993 in SHW (+108 kg) division at age 21
 results: total: 385.0 kg  –  snatch: 175.0 kg / clean&jerk: 210.0 kg
 1st place in U.S. Senior National Weightlifting Championships 1994 in SHW (+108 kg) division at age 22
 results: total: 387.5 kg  –  snatch: 172.5 kg / clean&jerk: 215.0 kg
 1st place in U.S. Senior National Weightlifting Championships 1996 in SHW (+108 kg) division at age 24
 results: total: 400.0 kg  –  snatch: 180.0 kg / clean&jerk: 220.0 kg
 Mark Henry was voted as the #1 outstanding lifter of the championships
 U.S. Olympic Festival Championships
 1st place in U.S. Olympic Festival Championships 1993 in SHW (+108 kg) division at age 22
 1st place in U.S. Olympic Festival Championships 1994 in SHW (+108 kg) division at age 23
 USA Weightlifting American Open Championships
 2nd place in the American Open Weightlifting Championships 1991 in SHW (+110 kg) division at age 20
 1st place in the American Open Weightlifting Championships 1992 in SHW (+110 kg) division at age 21
 RECORDS
 Junior US American record holder (+110 kg) in the Snatch at 162.5 kg, Clean and jerk at 202.5 kg, and Total at 362.5 kg (1986–1992)
 Senior US American record holder (+108 kg) in the Snatch at 180.0 kg, Clean and jerk at 220.0 kg, and Total at 400.0 kg (1993–1997)

Strength athletics
 Arnold Classic
 Arnold Strongman Classic – Winner 2002
 First man in history to one-hand clean and push press the "unliftable" Thomas Inch dumbbell (2 3/8" (6.03 cm) diameter handle)
 The Second Strongest Man That Ever Lived according to Flex Magazine

 International Sports Hall of Fame
 International Sports Hall of Fame (Class of 2012)

Professional wrestling

Cauliflower Alley Club
Iron Mike Mazurki Award (2019)
George Tragos/Lou Thesz Professional Wrestling Hall of Fame
Frank Gotch Award (2021) 
 Pro Wrestling Illustrated''
 Most Improved Wrestler of the Year (2011)
 Ranked No. 9 of the top 500 singles wrestlers in the PWI 500 in 2012
 Ranked No. 472 of the top 500 greatest wrestlers in the "PWI Years" in 2003
 World Wrestling Federation/Entertainment/WWE
 ECW Championship (1 time)
 World Heavyweight Championship (1 time)
 WWF European Championship (1 time)
 WWE Hall of Fame (Class of 2018)
 Slammy Award (3 times)
"Holy $#!+ Move of the Year" (2011) 
Feat of Strength of the Year (2013) 
Match of the Year (2014) –

See also
 List of strongmen
 List of powerlifters

References

External links

 
 
 
 
 
 
 Mark Henry – The Strongest Man That Ever Lived (article by Ben Tatar)
 Mark Henry's impressive achievements over the ropes by Katie Raymonds on WWE.com
 International Sports Hall of Fame: Mark Henry featured in pictures and Acceptance Speech video clips
 Powerliftingwatch of all-time powerlifting records, including Mark Henry's
 Video: Mark Henry at the Arnold Strongman Classic 2002 (introduction+Apollon's Wheel+Inch dumbbell)
 Video: Mark Henry lifting the "unliftable" Thomas Inch Dumbbell as the first man in history
 Video: Mark Henry wins the 1995 USAPL (ADFPA) National Powerlifting Championships and deadlifts 903 lb

1971 births
All Elite Wrestling personnel
American male professional wrestlers
American male weightlifters
American powerlifters
American strength athletes
African-American male professional wrestlers
ECW Heavyweight Champions/ECW World Heavyweight Champions
Living people
Olympic weightlifters of the United States
Pan American Games bronze medalists for the United States
Pan American Games gold medalists for the United States
Pan American Games medalists in weightlifting
Pan American Games silver medalists for the United States
Sportspeople with dyslexia
People from Silsbee, Texas
Professional wrestlers from Texas
The Nation of Domination members
Weightlifters at the 1992 Summer Olympics
Weightlifters at the 1995 Pan American Games
Weightlifters at the 1996 Summer Olympics
World Heavyweight Champions (WWE)
WWE Hall of Fame inductees
WWF European Champions
Medalists at the 1995 Pan American Games
21st-century African-American sportspeople
20th-century African-American sportspeople
20th-century professional wrestlers
21st-century professional wrestlers